Paula Lynn Cao Hok (née Obañana; born 19 March 1985) is a Filipino-American badminton player who was originally from Dumaguete, Philippines. In 2015, she won the women's doubles gold medals at the Pan American Games in Toronto, Canada partnered with Eva Lee. In 2016, she competed at the Summer Olympics in Rio de Janeiro, Brazil.

Personal life 
Obañana, started training at the age of 10 during her elementary years at the Silliman University Elementary School. She later joined the High School Badminton Varsity Team at Silliman University and was subsequently awarded "Athlete of the Year", "Most Outstanding Athlete of the Year", and "Most Valuable Player". After graduating from high school she was recruited on a scholarship at the De La Salle University in Manila, Philippines where she eventually obtained her bachelor's degree. She left the Philippines in 2006, where her mother Nenita had been recruited to work as a nurse in Minnesota. Obañana officially became a U.S. citizen in May 2011.

Achievements

Pan American Games 
Women's doubles

Mixed doubles

Pan Am Championships 
Women's doubles

BWF Grand Prix (1 runner-up) 
The BWF Grand Prix had two levels, the Grand Prix and Grand Prix Gold. It was a series of badminton tournaments sanctioned by the Badminton World Federation (BWF) and played between 2007 and 2017.

Women's doubles

  BWF Grand Prix Gold tournament
  BWF Grand Prix tournament

BWF International Challenge/Series (18 titles, 12 runners-up) 
Women's doubles

Mixed doubles

  BWF International Challenge tournament
  BWF International Series tournament
  BWF Future Series tournament

References

External links 
 
 

Living people
1985 births
21st-century American women
People from Dumaguete
Sportspeople from Negros Oriental
Filipino female badminton players
Competitors at the 2003 Southeast Asian Games
Competitors at the 2005 Southeast Asian Games
American sportspeople of Filipino descent
American female badminton players
Badminton players at the 2016 Summer Olympics
Olympic badminton players of the United States
Badminton players at the 2011 Pan American Games
Badminton players at the 2015 Pan American Games
Badminton players at the 2019 Pan American Games
Medalists at the 2011 Pan American Games
Medalists at the 2015 Pan American Games
Medalists at the 2019 Pan American Games
Pan American Games gold medalists for the United States
Pan American Games bronze medalists for the United States
Pan American Games medalists in badminton
Southeast Asian Games competitors for the Philippines